McCormick Field Raceway was constructed around 1957 and was a quarter-mile oval track built around a baseball diamond after Asheville, North Carolina had lost its minor league team. The track hosted weekly stock car races, a pair of NASCAR Convertible Series (now NASCAR Xfinity Series), and one Grand National (now NASCAR Cup Series) race.

History

Grand National
NASCAR's top series only raced once at McCormick Field.  A likely reason for the abbreviated run was a large obstacle the drivers had to avoid. Built around the tight confines of a baseball field, drivers had to pay particularly close attention.   Lee Petty was running near the front during a heat race at the track when a bump from Cotton Owens sent him into the first-base dugout. The team repaired Petty's car in time for the main event and he finished one lap down in fourth place. Jim Paschal won driving a car owned by Julien Petty, Lee's brother.

Convertible Division
Curtis Turner won the 1956 and 1957 NASCAR Convertible Division races which were the only two races held at the track.

References

Buildings and structures completed in 1957
NASCAR tracks